At least three ships of the Royal Danish Navy have borne the name HDMS Galathea:

  a corvette launched in 1831 and decommissioned in 1861
  an  launched in 1916 and sold for scrap in 1946
  a survey ship launched as HMS Leith. Acquired by the Danish Navy from mercantile service and renamed in 1949; she was sold for scrap in 1955

Royal Danish Navy ship names